Jordan Monaghan is a British serial killer who murdered his girlfriend, his 24-day-old daughter, his 21-month-old son and attempted to murder another child.

Crimes and court proceedings
On 1 January 2013 Monaghan smothered his 24-day-old daughter Ruby at their Blackburn home.
On 17 August 2013 Monaghan smothered his 21-month old son Logan while they were alone in a changing room cubicle at Waves Water Fun Centre in Blackburn.
On 24 October 2019 Monaghan poisoned his 23-year old girlfriend Evie Adams at Blackburn.

A post-mortem examination concluded Ruby died from acute bronchopneumonia and Logan's cause of death remained "unascertained" as neither child's death could be explained by illness, genetic defect or natural causes, and Monaghan was arrested for the murders in January 2018 after police reviewed their deaths when further information came to light.

While on bail for the children's murders, Monaghan poisoned Evie Adams with a deadly cocktail of prescription drugs, including tramadol and diazepam, which he had purchased unlawfully on the black market after she threatened to end their relationship.

On 17 December 2021 Monaghan was found guilty of all three murders as well as two counts of attempted murder to a third child who was not identified for legal reasons and he was sentenced to life imprisonment with 40 years before he can apply for parole. In July 2022 his minimum term was increased to 48 years on appeal.

See also
 List of serial killers in the United Kingdom

References 

1991 births
21st-century English criminals
English criminals
English male criminals
English murderers
English murderers of children
English people convicted of murder
English prisoners sentenced to life imprisonment
English serial killers
Filicides in England
Living people
Male serial killers
Poisoners